Eric Robert James Hussey (24 April 1885 – 19 May 1958) was a British colonial administrator and track and field athlete who competed in the 1908 Summer Olympics. He was born in Blandford Forum and died in Cuckfield.

In 1908 he was eliminated in the semi-finals of the 110 metre hurdles competition after finishing second in his heat.

He was appointed to the colonial Sudan Civil Service in 1908 and taught at Gordon Memorial College. He held various other roles as an educator in Africa and wrote several works on his experiences.

Hussey led the development of colonial educational plans in Sudan and Nigeria and the upgrade of Makerere to become a higher training institution and the establishment of Yaba College.

Life 
Hussey was born to the family of James Hussey and Martha Ellen Hussey (née Hewitt), his father was  a theology graduate of Wadham College. 

The elder Hussey was clergyman in Durweston when Hussey was born in 1885. Hussey attended Repton School between 1899 and 1904 and was active participant in school athletics and earned recognition for his athletic achievements including setting a school record in the 120 yards hurdles. He then gained a scholarship to attend Hertford College, Oxford. At Oxford, he became one of the nation's top hurdlers and represented Great Britain in the 1908 Olympics.

Career in East Africa 
Upon graduation, Hussey who might have been enticed by the generous benefits of colonial service applied to the Sudan Political Service. He was a model candidate for what Lord Cromer was trying to develop among officers in Sudan, someone with athletic abilities and fair academic result. Hussey was accepted as tutor within the Sudan Educational Service, firstly working at Gordon College and assisting in the development of a primary education plan. Between 1908 and 1920, Hussey's work in Sudan gained the notice of Geoffrey Archer, an administrator in Somaliland who requested Hussey's advice in the development of primary education within the territory. But many of his recommendations were delayed due to financial difficulties while his effort was admired by Archer who again requested Hussey to help advice on plans on developing education in Uganda.

Hussey's plan for Uganda was extensive, an effort to restructure an educational system dominated by mission schools who were at times in dispute with each other. He recommended the creation of a Director of Education, a new grants-in-aid structure, an upgrade to Makerere institution to offer professional training courses and also an upgrade on many mission schools offering primary education.  A few intermediate schools will offer a pathway to Makerere. In 1925, he was appointed the first Director of Education in Uganda where he followed an educational policy to enhance the social and cultural fabric of Ugandan communities. Hussey was able to push through many of his recommendations.

Career in Nigeria 
In 1929, Hussey accepted a position as the First Director of Education following the amalgamation of the North and South protectorates. In 1930, he concluded his report on educations plans in Nigeria, partly influenced by the 1926, Hadow report on the education of adolescents. In Nigeria, he sought to limit mission schools to offer nursery and primary education up to standard IV instead of standard VI. 

He was unenthusiastic about the quality of education offered to graduates who became eligible to commercial or government work after passing standard VI exams. His plan envisioned an intermediate junior secondary school from standard V to standard VIII and a two-year senior secondary education which will offer courses on craft work. Hussey's interest in increasing the sphere of government in education had some push back from the missions. His policies followed an adaptation theory of education to instill part of community life and culture in education. However, financial constraints affected a full implementation of his educational plans.

Hussey devoted effort to the establishment of Yaba Higher College and upgrade of teacher training institutions. Yaba College was opened by Governor Cameron in 1934. Hussey retired from colonial service in 1936.

Post-retirement 
Hussey joined the National Society in 1936 and was secretary from late 1936 to 1942. In 1940, he became a member of the Advisory Committee on Education in the Colonies.

Family 
His son Marmaduke Hussey, Baron Hussey of North Bradley was Chairman of the Board of Governors of the BBC.

See also 
 Hussey College Warri

References

1885 births
1958 deaths
English male hurdlers
Olympic athletes of Great Britain
Athletes (track and field) at the 1908 Summer Olympics
People from Blandford Forum
Sportspeople from Dorset
Colonial Education Service officers
Anglo-Egyptian Sudan people